This is a list of notable alumni of Horace Mann School in the Bronx, New York.

 Desiree Akhavan '03, director, writer, actress; winner 2018 Sundance Film Festival Grand Jury Prize
 Pedro Alvarez '05, Major League baseball player
 Harrison Bader ‘12, Major League baseball outfielder for the New York Yankees
 Erik Barnouw, writer, critic, documentary filmmaker, Columbia University professor
 William Barr, U.S. Attorney General under Presidents George H. W. Bush and Donald Trump
 Alex Berenson, spy novelist, former reporter for The New York Times
 Josh Bernstein ‘89 – host of The History Channel's Digging For the Truth
 Ilse Bischoff, painter, printmaker, illustrator, and author
 Alan Blinken, former United States Ambassador to Belgium (1993–1997)
 Donald M. Blinken, investment banker, former Ambassador to Hungary
 Adam Brook, thoracic surgeon
 Amy S. Bruckman, ‘83, Professor at Georgia Institute of Technology
 Robert Caro‘53, author and two-time Pulitzer Prize winner
 Elliott Carter, composer and two-time Pulitzer Prize-winner
 Chao-chu Chi Returned to China and became interpreter for Zhou Enlai and Mao Zedong.
 Roy Cohn, aide to Senator Joseph McCarthy, lead prosecutor in the Julius and Ethel Rosenberg trial
 David Cornstein, US ambassador to Hungary
 Joseph Cumming, Yale scholar and pastor
 John Dall, actor
 Jerome Alan Danzig, reporter, news producer, and adviser to New York Governor Nelson A. Rockefeller
 Peter Deutsch, former congressman
 Valentine Davies, class of 1923, author of Miracle on 34th Street
 Bethany Donaphin, class of 1998, Head of Operations at the Women's National Basketball Association
 Orvil Dryfoos, publisher of The New York Times
 Martin Duberman, class of 1948, author and gay rights historian.
 Seymour Durst, real estate developer
 Morris Leopold Ernst, lawyer and co-founder the American Civil Liberties Union
 Charles Evans, founder of fashion house Evan-Piccone, and producer of Tootsie
 Halley Feiffer, class of 2003, playwright 
 Ivan Fisher, prominent lawyer
 Marc Fisher, class of 1976, writer and editor for The Washington Post
 Doris Fleischman, American writer, public relations executive, and feminist activist
 Jennifer Fleiss, entrepreneur and co-founder of Rent the Runway
 Alan Furst, novelist
 Henry Geldzahler, class of 1953, art critic, curator, New York City Cultural Affairs Commissioner, (1977–1982)
 Carl Gershman, President of the National Endowment for Democracy
 Mark Gerstein, bioinformatics professor, Yale University
 Alison Gertz, early AIDS activist
 Bill Green, Republican member of the US House of Representatives from New York
 Alexandra Guarnaschelli, executive chef and food television personality
 Betty Hall, politician, New Hampshire state representative
 Joshua Hammer, journalist and author
 Leland Hayward, Hollywood agent and Broadway producer
 Robert Heilbroner, economist, historian of economic thought, author
 Anthony Hecht, poet
 Marsha Hunt, actress
 E. J. Kahn, class of 1933, pillar of The New Yorker, author and journalist
 Rockwell Kent, famous American illustrator and painter
 Jack Kerouac, class of 1940, writer and Beat Literature iconoclast
 Edward Koren, New Yorker cartoonist
 Richard Kluger, class of 1952, author and Pulitzer Prize winner
 Robert Ledley, class of 1943, inventor of whole-body CT scanner, biomedical computing pioneer
 Sir Thomas Legg, senior British civil servant
 Tom Lehrer, political satirist and math professor
 David Leonhardt, economics columnist for The New York Times, Pulitzer Prize winner for commentary, 2011
 Ira Levin, author of Rosemary's Baby and The Stepford Wives
Andrew Levitas, artist and filmmaker
 Anthony Lewis, class of 1944, journalist and two-time Pulitzer Prize-winner
 Allard K. Lowenstein, civil rights leader and former congressman
 Joshua Malina, actor and member of the cast of the television series The West Wing
 David Mandel, class of 1988, television writer and producer for Curb Your Enthusiasm
 Jonathan Marks, class of 1971, anthropologist
 Michael Mazur, artist
 Dorothy Miner, Class of 1922, art historian and curator at the Walters Art Museum
 Dwight C. Miner, Class of 1922, professor of history at Columbia University
 Lucy Monroe, operatic soprano
 Martin Moynihan, class of 1946, ethologist and founding director of the Smithsonian Tropical Research Institute in Panama
 James Murdoch, media executive; son of Rupert Murdoch
 Donald Newhouse, publisher
 Samuel Newhouse, media executive
 Rebecca Oppenheimer class of 1990, astrophysicist
 Ilario Pantano class of 1989, former marine, political figure
Nelson Peltz (born 1942), billionaire businessman and investor
 Mark Penn, one of the United States' premier pollsters and political consultants
 Mary Petty, illustrator
 Kenneth Pollack, analyst and author on Middle East affairs
 Generoso Pope, Jr., founder of the National Enquirer and American Media, Inc.
 Thomas S. Power, led Strategic Air Command
 Paul Rapoport, co-founder of New York City Lesbian, Gay, Bisexual and Transgender Community Services Center and Gay Men's Health Crisis
 Giles Sutherland Rich, patent attorney, author of the 1952 Patent Act, judge of the U.S. Customs and Patent Appeals and later U.S. Court of Appeals for the Federal Circuit
 Renée Richards, class of 1952 (graduated as Richard Raskind), professional tennis player, author, ophthalmologist, and Trans Rights activist
 Scott Rogowsky, class of 2003, comedian and host of HQ Trivia
 Daniel Rose, real estate developer, philanthropist, essayist
 David S. Rose, entrepreneur, investor and author
 Elihu Rose, real estate developer and military historian
 Frederick P. Rose, builder and philanthropist
 Gideon Rose, Foreign Affairs
 Jonathan F. P. Rose, urban planner and real estate developer
 Evan Rosen, journalist, strategist, author of The Culture of Collaboration and The Bounty Effect
 Jon Rubinstein, computer scientist and electrical engineer. A primary co-creator of the iPod and iMac
 Edward Thomas Ryan, class of 1980, Harvard microbiologist, immunologist
 James Salter, class of 1942, writer
 David Sanders, class of 1979, biologist
 Marion K. Sanders, class of 1921, journalist, editor, author
 Barry Scheck, class of 1967, member of legal team that successfully defended O. J. Simpson; attorney and founder of the Innocence Project
 James Schlesinger, former Secretary of Defense in the Nixon and Ford administrations and former Secretary of Energy in the Carter Administration
 Doug Schoen, political pollster, consultant and pundit; former partner of HM classmate Mark Penn
 John Searle, philosopher
 Charles Seife, class of 1989, mathematician and author
 Noah Shachtman, class of 1989, editor of The Daily Beast
 Gil Shaham, class of 1989, violinist
 Orli Shaham, class of 1993, pianist
 John Simon, New York Magazine critic and author
 Andrew Solomon, class of 1981, writer
 Jerry Speyer, class of 1958,  a founder Tishman Speyer
 Eliot Spitzer, former Governor and Attorney General of New York
 Austin Stark, award-winning filmmaker 
 Edward Steinfeld, class of 1984, noted political scientist
 Arthur Hays Sulzberger, publisher of The New York Times
 Robert W. Sweet, United States District Court Judge
 Robert Tishman, real estate developer and co-founder of Tishman Speyer
 Beatrice Warde, writer and scholar on typography, author of “The Crystal Goblet, or Printing Should Be Invisible”
 Paul Francis Webster, class of 1926, Academy Award-winning and Grammy Award-winning songwriter
 William Carlos Williams, class of 1903, medical doctor and poet; Pulitzer Prize winner
 Gertrude Weil, class of 1897 (or 1898?), suffragist, labor rights activist, civil rights and anti-lynching activist, and Zionist
 Ben Yagoda, journalist and author
 Rafael Yglesias, novelist and screenwriter
 Paul Zimmerman, senior football writer for Sports Illustrated

References 

Lists of people by school affiliation in New York (state)
 
Bronx-related lists